Simeon Ivanov Simeonov (26 March 1946 – 2 November 2000) was a Bulgarian football (soccer) goalkeeper.

He played mostly for PFC Slavia Sofia, and for the Bulgaria national football team. He participated at three editions of FIFA World Cup in 1966, 1970 and 1974. He gained 34 caps for Bulgaria.

In December 1968, Simeonov put in a brilliant display, making many saves to earn his nation an impressive 1-1 draw with world champions England at Wembley Stadium.

References

Bulgarian footballers
Association football goalkeepers
1966 FIFA World Cup players
1970 FIFA World Cup players
1974 FIFA World Cup players
Bulgaria international footballers
PFC Slavia Sofia players
First Professional Football League (Bulgaria) players
Footballers from Sofia
1946 births
2000 deaths